Die Schönste is an East German film. It was completed in 1957, but was never shown publicly due to censorship. After reunification it was recreated and in this form had its premier in 2002.

Plot
Two boys in West Berlin steal their own mothers' jewellery to find out whether the ladies are still admired without these adornments.

External links
 

1957 films
East German films
1950s German-language films
Films set in Berlin
Films set in Hamburg
1950s German films